The women's tournament of the 2017 FIBA 3x3 U18 World Cup host in Chengdu, China was contested by 20 teams.

Participating teams

Every FIBA zone except FIBA Africa were represented. The top 20 teams, including the hosts, based on the FIBA National Federation ranking qualified for the tournament as of 01.03.2017.

FIBA Asia (6)
  (12)
  (13)
  (17)
  (18)
  (19)
  (20)

FIBA Africa (0)
 None

FIBA Oceania (1)
  (16)

FIBA Americas (3)
  (3)
  (8)
  (14)

FIBA Europe (9)
  (1)
  (2)
  (4)
  (5)
  (6)
  (7)
  (9)
  (10)
  (11)
  (15)

Main tournament

Preliminary round

Group A

Group B

Group C

Group D

Knockout stage

Final standings

References

Women